The Emperor of Capri (Italian: L'imperatore di Capri) is a 1949 Italian comedy film directed by Luigi Comencini and starring Totò, Yvonne Sanson and Marisa Merlini.

The film's sets were designed by the art director Carlo Egidi.

Cast
Totò as Antonio De Fazio
Yvonne Sanson as Sonia Bulgarov
Marisa Merlini as La baronesa von Krapfen
Laura Gore as Lucia
Mario Castellani as Asdrubale Stinchi
Pina Gallini as La suocera
Nino Marchetti as Geremia
Nerio Bernardi as Osvaldo
Alda Mangini as Emanuela
Piero Tordi as Il marito di Emanuela
Galeazzo Benti as Dodo della Baggina
Gianni Appelius as Bubi di Primaporta
Aldo Giuffrè as Omar Bey Kahn di Agapur
Enrico Glori as Il maggiordomo
Lino Robi as Basilio
Toni Ucci as Pupetto Turacciolo

References

Bibliography 
 Moliterno, Gino. A to Z of Italian Cinema. Scarecrow Press, 2009.

External links

1949 films
1940s Italian-language films
Films directed by Luigi Comencini
1949 comedy films
Films set in Capri, Campania
Italian black-and-white films
Italian comedy films
Lux Film films
1940s Italian films